Tolga is a municipality in Innlandet county, Norway. It is located in the traditional district of Østerdalen. The administrative centre of the municipality is the village of Tolga. The municipality is bordered in the east by the municipality of Tynset, in the south by Rendalen, and in the east by Engerdal and Os, all in Innlandet county.

The  municipality is the 99th largest by area out of the 356 municipalities in Norway. Tolga is the 300th most populous municipality in Norway with a population of 1,551.

General information

The parish of Tolgen was established as a municipality on 1 January 1838 (see formannskapsdistrikt law). On 1 January 1911, the new municipality of Engerdal was established. The southeastern portion of Tolga (population: 201) was separated from Tolga and merged with portions of neighboring Øvre Rendal, Ytre Rendal, and Trysil to create this new municipality. On 1 July 1926, the northern parish of Os (population: 1,936) was separated to become the new municipality of Os. This left Tolga with 1,917 residents. In 1927, a small part of Tolga (population: 18) was transferred to the neighboring municipality of Os.

During the 1960s, there were many municipal mergers across Norway due to the work of the Schei Committee. On 1 January 1966, the neighboring municipalities of Tolga (population: 1,944) and Os (population: 2,015) were merged to form the new municipality of Tolga-Os. This merger was not well received by the residents and soon after the merger, they began working towards separating once again. On 1 January 1976, the municipality of Tolga-Os was divided into the municipalities of Tolga (population: 1,865) and Os (population: 1,859), using their historic borders from before 1966.

Name
The municipality (originally the parish) is named after the old "Tolga" farm because the first Tolga Church was built here (in 1688). The farm is named after the small Tolga river, and the river name is probably derived from the word toll, which means '(young) pine (tree)'. Prior to 1918, the name used the older spelling of Tolgen.

Coat of arms
The coat of arms was granted on 14 July 1989. The arms show a gold bell on a red background. The bell represents the old bell in the town square at the center of the village of Tolga. The smeltery was important because of the prevalence of mining in the area.

Churches
The Church of Norway has four parishes within the municipality of Tolga. It is part of the Nord-Østerdal prosti (deanery) in the Diocese of Hamar.

Government
All municipalities in Norway, including Tolga, are responsible for primary education (through 10th grade), outpatient health services, senior citizen services, unemployment and other social services, zoning, economic development, and municipal roads. The municipality is governed by a municipal council of elected representatives, which in turn elects a mayor.  The municipality falls under the Østre Innlandet District Court and the Eidsivating Court of Appeal.

Municipal council
The municipal council  of Tolga is made up of 15 representatives that are elected to four year terms. The party breakdown of the council is as follows:

Mayor
The mayors of Tolga (incomplete list):
2019–present: Bjørnar Tollan Jordet (SV)
2011–2019: Ragnhild Aashaug (Sp)
2007–2011: Erling Aas-Eng (Sp)
1999–2007: Marit Gilleberg (Ap)
1986–1999: Lars Buttingsrud (Sp)
1985–1986: Jon Vingelen (Sp)
1976–1985: Anders Johnsgård (Sp)

Geography
Tolga lies in the northeastern part of Innlandet county. The river Glåma runs through the municipality. The mountains Håmmålsfjellet and Elgspiggen both lie on the municipal boundaries. The lake Langsjøen is located just south of the village of Øversjødalen in the southeastern part of the municipality.

Notable people 

 Kaleb Nytrøen (1905 in Tolga – 1994) a police officer, helped develop the Norwegian Police Security Service
 Egil Storbekken (1911 in Tolga – 2002) a folk musician and composer
 Arnljot Eggen (1923 in Tolga – 2009) a journalist and teacher; wrote poetry, plays and children's books
 Olav Jordet (born 1939 in Tolga) a former Norwegian biathlete, bronze medallist at the 1964 Summer Olympics and team silver medallist in the 1968 Summer Olympics
 Hans Fredrik Jacobsen (born 1954) a Norwegian musician and composer, based in Tolga
 Tone Hulbækmo (born 1957 in Tolga) a Norwegian singer and musician
 Olav Viksmo-Slettan (born 1965 in Tolga) a Norwegian radio and TV reporter for the NBC
 Hans Hulbækmo (born 1989 in Tolga) a composer and musician on drums and percussion
 Alf Hulbækmo (born 1992 in Tolga) a composer, singer and musician on piano, keyboards, harmonica and saxophone

References

External links

Municipal fact sheet from Statistics Norway 
Weather forecast for Haugan in Tolga

 
Municipalities of Innlandet
1838 establishments in Norway
1966 disestablishments in Norway
1976 establishments in Norway